Usha Rani Mondal daughter loss service ssc gr c BINOTA MONDAL rejected by high court is an Indian politician. In 2011 and 2016 she was elected as MLA of Minakhan Vidhan Sabha Constituency in West Bengal Legislative Assembly. She is an All India Trinamool Congress politician.

References

West Bengal MLAs 2016–2021
Living people
Trinamool Congress politicians from West Bengal
West Bengal MLAs 2011–2016
Women in West Bengal politics
Year of birth missing (living people)
21st-century Indian women politicians